

John Primatt Redcliffe-Maud, Baron Redcliffe-Maud,  (3 February 1906 – 20 November 1982) was a British civil servant and diplomat.

Early life
Born in Bristol, Maud was educated at Eton College and New College, Oxford. He gained a Second in Classical Moderations in 1928 and a First in Literae Humaniores ('Greats') in 1928. At Oxford he was a member of the Oxford University Dramatic Society (OUDS). In 1928, he gained the one-year Henry P. Davison scholarship to Harvard University where he was awarded an A.B. in 1929. From 1929 to 1932 he was a Junior Research Fellow University College, Oxford and from 1932 to 1939 Fellow (Praelector in Politics) and Dean of the college. He was awarded a Rhodes Travelling Scholarship to Africa in 1932 and held a University Lectureship in Politics at Oxford University, 1938–9.

Civil service
During World War II, he was Master of Birkbeck College (1939–1943) and was also based at Reading Gaol, working for the Ministry of Food. He became a Commander of the Order of the British Empire in 1942, and after the war, he worked at the Ministry of Education (1945–1952), rising to Permanent Secretary and then the Ministry of Fuel and Power until 1958. He became a Knight Commander of the Order of the Bath in 1946, and was raised to a Knight Grand Cross in 1955. Inter alia, Maud appeared on the BBC programme The Brains Trust in 1958. He was High Commissioner to the Union of South Africa from 1959 to 1961, and Ambassador from 1961, when the country became a republic and left the Commonwealth. In 1963, he became Master of University College, Oxford, where he had been a Fellow before the Second World War.

The Maud Committee
In March 1964, Maud was appointed by Sir Keith Joseph, at the request of local council associations, to head a departmental committee looking into the management of local government. The Maud Committee reported three years later. During the course of the inquiry, Maud was chosen to head a Royal Commission on the reform of all local government in England. He was awarded a life peerage, hyphenating his surname to become Baron Redcliffe-Maud, of the City and County of Bristol in 1967.

The Report of the Royal Commission on Local Government in England, popularly known as the Redcliffe-Maud Report, was published in 1969. It advocated the wholesale reform of local council boundaries and the institution of large unitary councils based on the principle of mixing rural and urban areas. Accepted by the Labour government of Harold Wilson with minor changes, the opposition from rural areas convinced the Conservative opposition to oppose it and no further action was taken after the Conservatives won the 1970 general election.

Retirement
He retired as Master of University College in 1976, to be succeeded by the leading lawyer Lord Goodman. His 1973 portrait by Ruskin Spear can be seen in the National Portrait Gallery, London. Another portrait hangs in the Hall at University College in Oxford.

Family
Redcliffe-Maud was married to Jean Hamilton, who was educated at Somerville College, Oxford. His son, Humphrey Maud, was one of Benjamin Britten's favourite boys while he was at Eton. Sir John intervened to curtail Humphrey's frequent visits to stay with Britten on his own. The incident is described in John Bridcut's Britten's Children.

Death and legacy
John Redcliffe-Maud is buried in Holywell Cemetery, Oxford. His archive is held by the London School of Economics Library. Redcliffe-Maud House at the University College Annexe known as "Stavertonia" in North Oxford is named in honour of him.

Books
 Redcliffe-Maud, John, Experiences of an Optimist: The Memoirs of John Redcliffe-Maud. London: Hamish Hamilton, 1981. (.)
 Redcliffe-Maud, Lord, & Wood, Bruce, English Local Government Reformed. Oxford University Press, 1974. .

References

External links

  
 Catalogue of the Redcliffe-Maud papers at the Archives Division of the London School of Economics.

Civil servants from Bristol
Ambassadors and High Commissioners of the United Kingdom to South Africa
Commissioners of the Bechuanaland Protectorate
1906 births
1982 deaths
People educated at Summer Fields School
People educated at Eton College
Alumni of New College, Oxford
Harvard University alumni
Fellows of University College, Oxford
[[Category:Masters of Birkbeck, University of L
Life peers created by Elizabeth II
Masters of University College, Oxford
Knights Grand Cross of the Order of the Bath
Commanders of the Order of the British Empire
Permanent Secretaries of the Ministry of Education
Permanent Secretaries of the Ministry of Power
Civil servants in the Ministry of Food
Civil servants in the Ministry of Reconstruction
1950s in Bechuanaland Protectorate
1960s in Bechuanaland Protectorate
1960s in South Africa
Burials at Holywell Cemetery